South Fork Hughes River is a  long 4th order tributary to Hughes River in Ritchie and Wirt Counties, West Virginia.  This is the only stream of this name in the United States.

Course
South Fork Hughes River rises about 2 miles northeast of Grove, West Virginia, and then flows westerly and joins the Hughes River about 4 miles southeast of Freeport.

Watershed
South Fork Hughes River drains  of area, receives about 45.4 in/year of precipitation, has a wetness index of 255.86, and is about 87% forested.

See also
List of rivers of West Virginia

References

Rivers of West Virginia
Rivers of Doddridge County, West Virginia
Rivers of Ritchie County, West Virginia
Rivers of Wirt County, West Virginia